James Gilmore (May 1, 1853 – November 18, 1928) was an American professional baseball player who played three games for the Washington Nationals during the  season.
He was born in Baltimore, Maryland and died there at the age of 75.

External links

Baseball players from Baltimore
Washington Nationals (NA) players
1853 births
1928 deaths
19th-century baseball players